The Flying Squad is a 1932 British crime film directed by F.W. Kraemer and starring Harold Huth, Carol Goodner, Henry Wilcoxon and Edward Chapman. It was based on a 1928 novel by Edgar Wallace, which was also filmed in 1929 and 1940. The screenplay was written by Bryan Edgar Wallace, based on his father's novel. The officers of the Flying Squad attempt to track down a drug-smuggling gang.

Cast
 Harold Huth as Mark McGill
 Carol Goodner as Ann Perryman
 Edward Chapman as Sedeman
 Campbell Gullan as Tiser
 Henry Wilcoxon as Inspector Bradley
 Abraham Sofaer as Li Yoseph
 Joe Cunningham as Simmonds

References

External links

1932 films
1932 crime films
Films based on works by Edgar Wallace
Remakes of British films
Sound film remakes of silent films
British crime films
British black-and-white films
1930s police procedural films
British police films
1930s British films